Middle Grove is a hamlet in the town of Greenfield, New York. Middle Grove has a post office with ZIP code 12850.

Middle Grove is located along the Kayaderosseras creek. The first sawmill in the town of Greenfield was established here in 1786, and it was the site of several paper mills. Middle Grove was the terminus of the Kaydeross Railroad.

The trailheads of the Hennig Preserve are located in Middle Grove.

References

Hamlets in Saratoga County, New York
Hamlets in New York (state)